The Last Stand is the eighth studio album by Swedish heavy metal band Sabaton. It was produced by Peter Tägtgren in the Abyss Studios in Sweden and released on 19 August 2016. Like Sabaton's previous album Heroes, The Last Stand is a concept album and takes inspiration from "last stand" military battles. On 10 June 2016 the first single "The Lost Battalion" was released, followed by "Blood of Bannockburn" on 15 July and "Shiroyama" on 12 August. A lyric video for the title track was released on 25 January 2018.

In 2021, Sabaton released a special History Channel Edition of the album to subscribers to the Sabaton History Patreon, featuring historical prefaces to each song by channel host Indy Neidell. The version had originally been planned for April 2020, but it and the History Channel Edition of Heroes suffered production delays due to the COVID-19 pandemic and label Nuclear Blast's purchase by Believe Digital. The albums finally shipped to subscribers on 25 June 2021.

Track listing

Personnel 
 Joakim Brodén: lead vocals, keyboards
 Pär Sundström: bass, backing vocals
 Chris Rörland: guitars, backing vocals
 Thobbe Englund: guitars, backing vocals, co-lead vocals on "All Guns Blazing"
 Hannes van Dahl: drums, backing vocals

Additional credits:
 Spoken words on "Diary of an Unknown Soldier" by Jon Schaffer
 Bagpipes on "Blood of Bannockburn" by Jonas Kjellgren
 Hammond Organ on "Blood of Bannockburn" by Tomas Sunmo

Choir credits:
Christer Gärds, Anders Sandström, Bosse Gärds, Pontus Lekaregärd and Peter Hindén from Eternal (of Sweden), 
Thomas Nyström & Marie Mullback, Äsa Österlund, Hannele Junkala, Sofia Lundberg, Marie-Louise Strömqvist and Floor Jansen

Charts

Weekly charts

Year-end charts

Certifications

References 

2016 albums
Concept albums
Sabaton (band) albums
Nuclear Blast albums
Albums produced by Peter Tägtgren